ACES: The Society for Editing is a professional association of international scope for editors who work on every kind of content, including newspapers, magazines, websites, books, scholarly journals, and corporate communications.

, the group offered:
an annual meeting, the ACES conference
an annual virtual conference
member networking opportunities
a newsletter
scholarships (via the affiliated ACES Education Fund)
regional workshops
a website that offers educational materials, news, job listings, and an editors-for-hire board

ACES was formerly known as — and, is still legally incorporated as — the American Copy Editors Society, a registered 501(c)(3) nonprofit corporation.

Executive committee
ACES was founded in 1997, by Pam Robinson, who also served as its first president, and Hank Glamann. Its inception followed work of ASNE (American Society of News Editors; at the time, the American Society of Newspaper Editors) and meetings by copy editors in North Carolina and South Carolina. It is currently led by society president Sara Ziegler of FiveThirtyEight. John McIntyre of The Baltimore Sun was its second president. Chris Wienandt of the Dallas Morning News was its third president. Teresa Schmedding of the Daily Herald of Arlington Heights, Ill., was its fourth president.

It has an executive committee of 13 people, of whom four are officers: the president, vice president, secretary and treasurer. Any full member is eligible for elections. Annual membership is $75 for full members and $40 for students.

In 2008, the board approved changes that allowed copy editors working outside traditional journalism organizations full membership with voting rights. As of early 2023, the society had over 5,000 members.

Awards
ACES: The Society for Editing offers numerous scholarships, fellowships and awards to various editors annually. 

ACES awards two editors for their outstanding editing abilities, named after its founders: the Robinson Prize, which is awarded yearly to an outstanding editor, and the Glamann Award, which honors contributions to the craft.

ACES offers annual scholarships to up-and-coming student editors awarded to 6 students annually. 

The Richard S. Holden Diversity Fellowship is awarded to editors who show extraordinary promise in their fields. In addition to scholarship funds, the winners are given leadership and opportunities to advance their skills and careers. 

ACES also has hosted the annual National Grammar Day Tweeted Poetry Contest, a poem-writing contest celebrating National Grammar Day, March 4.

In-Person Conferences 

The ACES national conference features the fundamentals of the craft and a primer for what's to come. Each year, editors from all fields come together for three days of workshops, panel discussions and networking. Attendees include editors for newspapers, magazines, websites, trade publications, book publishers, nonprofit agencies and corporations, as well as students, journalism professors, consultants and freelancers.

The idea that led to the creation of ACES was nurtured during a series of three conferences about copy editing sponsored by the American Society of Newspaper Editors in 1995 and 1996.

When ACES was chartered in the spring of 1997, the top priority of the society's founders was to conduct their own national gathering.
Four months later, the first ACES national conference took place at the University of North Carolina at Chapel Hill.

Upcoming Conferences 

March 23 - March 25, 2023: Hyatt Regency, Columbus, Ohio

April 4 - April 7, 2024: Sheraton San Diego Hotel & Marina, San Diego, California

April 3 - April 6, 2025: Hilton Salt Lake City Center, Salt Lake City, Utah

April 23 - April 26, 2026: The Westin Peachtree Plaza, Atlanta, Georgia

References 

American journalism organizations
Editor organizations
American copy editors
Organizations established in 1997
Journalism-related professional associations
Professional associations based in the United States
American writers' organizations